The Adanates or Edenates were a small Gallic tribe dwelling around present-day Seyne, in the Alpes Cottiae, during the Iron Age.

Name 
They are mentioned as Edenates (var. -) by Pliny (1st c. AD), and as Adanatium on the Arc of Susa.

The etymology of the name Adanates is unclear. Guy Barruol has proposed to compare it with Adenatius (or Adenatis) and Adana, and postulated an original *Senedenates, with loss of the initial s- retained in Sedena. According to Alexander Falileyev, "if the original form was indeed *Sed-, the name could be Celtic, from sedo- 'seat, location'; but in view of the form recorded in inscriptions, it is unlikely. If Eden- is the original form, the name does not appear Celtic." Xavier Delamarre has proposed to interpret the name as Ed-en-ati ('those from the land/country'), from a Gaulish stem edo-(n)- ('space, land').

Geography 
The Adanates dwelled around the settlement of Sedena (modern Seyne). Their territory was located south of the Avantici, west of the Savincates, east of the Sebaginni, and north of the Gallitae and Eguiturii.

History 
They are mentioned once in ancient texts by Pliny the Elder as one of the Alpine tribes conquered by Rome in 16–15 BC, and whose name was engraved on the Tropaeum Alpium. They also appear on the Arch of Susa, erected by Cottius in 9–8 BC.

References

Primary sources

Bibliography 

Historical Celtic peoples
Gauls
Tribes of pre-Roman Gaul